Senator Greer may refer to:

J. Ronnie Greer (born 1952), Tennessee State Senate
John W. Greer Jr. (1909–1994), Georgia State Senate
Thomas Greer (senator) (1853–1928), Northern Irish Senate